The Girl Next Door is a 1953 musical comedy film directed by Richard Sale, released by 20th Century Fox, and starring June Haver, Dan Dailey, and Dennis Day.

Background
This was June Haver's last film appearance. Haver had gained fame in the mid-to-late 1940s as a musical star for Fox; she starred in films like The Dolly Sisters, Irish Eyes Are Smiling, Where Do We Go from Here?, I Wonder Who's Kissing Her Now, Look for the Silver Lining, and I'll Get By. Haver departed from films to join a convent in 1952, but left the convent six months later and married actor Fred MacMurray.

When released, The Girl Next Door drew mixed press reviews; it did moderately well at the box-office.

Plot
A popular performer, Jeannie Laird decides to buy her first house and celebrate with a big party. The guests' enjoyment is interfered with by the happenings at the home of the next door neighbor, Bill Carter.

Carter is a comic-strip artist. He prides himself on every story he tells being true to life, including that of 10-year-old son Joey, whom he is raising alone. But when a relationship blossoms between Bill and Jeannie after a shaky start, a neglected Joey ends up blabbing to Bill's bosses that the comic strip's adventures have become far more fiction than fact.

Cast
 Dan Dailey as Bill Carter
 June Haver as Jeannie Laird
 Dennis Day as Reed Appleton
 Billy Gray as Joey Carter
 Cara Williams as Rosie Green
 Natalie Schafer as Evelyn, the maid
 Clinton Sundberg as Samuels, the butler
 Hayden Rorke as Henry Fields
 Mary Jane Saunders as Kitty

References

External links
 

1953 films
1953 musical comedy films
Films directed by Richard Sale
Films about fictional painters
Films about comics
20th Century Fox films
American musical comedy films
1950s English-language films
1950s American films